Ucar is a city and the centre of the Ujar District of Azerbaijan.

External links

World Gazetteer: Azerbaijan – World-Gazetteer.com

Populated places in Ujar District